ʻAbd al-Jamīl (ALA-LC romanization of ) is a Muslim given name of Arabic origin, made from the elements  ʻabd and al-Jamīl, meaning servant of the beautiful one.

It may refer to:

 Abdul Jamil Khan (born 1930), Pakistani medical doctor
 Abdul Jamil Tajik, Pakistani American researcher
 Tun Abdul Jamil (died 1688), Malay warrior of the Johor Sultanate
 Mustafa Abdülcemil Dzhemilev (born 1943), Chairman of the Mejlis of the Crimean Tatar People

See also
 Cemil
 Jamil

Arabic masculine given names